The North Carolina Department of Revenue was created in 1921 by the North Carolina General Assembly. The department is headed by a Secretary that is appointed by the Governor. The secretary is a member of the North Carolina Cabinet. Currently, the department is responsible for administering the collection of the North Carolina state income tax, gasoline tax, sales tax, beverage tax, and inheritance tax.

History
When the North Carolina Constitution was rewritten after the American Civil War in 1868, the North Carolina State Tax Commission was authorized to tax trades, professions, franchises, and incomes. In 1903, the State Tax Commission recommended transferring property tax assessments to local authorities vice the state and income, license, franchise, and inheritance taxes would remain with the state. In 1921, the General Assembly enacted a state-administered personal and corporate income tax. As part of this new tax legislation, the assembly created the Department of Revenue to administer, enforce and collect the income tax. The department was to be led by a Commissioner of Revenue, with the inaugural commissioner to be appointed by the Governor of North Carolina to a four-year term with the advice and consent of the State Senate and, beginning in 1924, the office holder was to be chosen in statewide popular elections. In 1929 the law was altered to eliminate election of the commissioner and instead have them be appointed by the governor.

At its inception, the Department of Revenue had 16 employees and worked out of the State Capitol's Senate Chamber, clerk's office and committee rooms. The department expanded over the following years and moved to different quarters as it was given new responsibilities, including management of the gasoline, licensing, and bus and truck franchise taxes and oversight of the North Carolina State Highway Patrol through a Motor Vehicle Bureau. When the financing of schools, roads, and prisons was shifted from local government to state government responsibility in the 1930s, a retail sales tax of three percent was enacted to pay for it with the Department of Revenue responsible for collecting it. The tax system under the Department of Revenue management has remained almost unchanged since then. In 1941 the General Assembly transformed the Motor Vehicle Bureau into an independent Department of Motor Vehicles, leaving the Department of Revenue with the responsibility of collecting the gasoline tax. The agency began using automated machinery to process individual income tax returns in 1960.

In 1971 the North Carolina General Assembly passed the Executive Reorganization Act. The law reformed the Department of Revenue to encompass the office of the commissioner of revenue, the Tax Research Board, and the State Board of Assessment. Two years later the title of the head of the department was changed from "commissioner" to "secretary". The General Assembly authorized the construction of a new headquarters in Raleigh for the department in 1986, and it was brought into use in 1992. The department was equipped with a computer system to host an integrated records database and collect and process taxes electronically in the 1990s; computerization was completed by 1997. In January 2011 a Local Government Division was created in the department to advise local government's tax collection, auditing, and other processes.

Structure and function 
The Department of Revenue is an agency represented in the North Carolina Cabinet. It collects state taxes and administers tax legislation. It also researches taxation and supervises property assessing in the state. It is led by the Secretary of Revenue. Appointed by the governor, the secretary is an ex officio member of the State Tax Review Board and the North Carolina Local Government Commission. Under the secretary are a chief operating officer and five assistant secretaries. The Internal Audit Division director, a legislative liaison, public affairs director, chief financial officer, Office of the Taxpayer Advocate director, a human resources director, a general counsel, and an administrative assistant all report to the secretary. The assistant secretaries report to the chief operating officer.

The five assistant secretaries' responsibilities are defined as follows:
Assistant Secretary for Tax Administration
Corporate Tax Division
Personal Tax Division
Excise Tax Division
Sales and Use Tax Division
Local Government Division
Assistant Secretary for Business Services
Business Operations
Purchasing
Tax Schedule Implementation
Customer Service
Service Operations
Submissions Processing
Digital Communications
Service Management Applications and Testing
Assistant Secretary for Tax Enforcement and Compliance
Examination Division
Taxpayer Assistance and Collection Division
Criminal Investigation Division
Tax Analytics Division
Involuntary Compliance Logistics and Operations Support Division
Assistant Secretary and Chief Information Officer
IT Systems Development and Support
Cyber Security
Networking Services
Innovation and Continuous Delivery 
Project Management Office
Technical Architecture
Cloud Services
 Assistant Secretary for Tax Research & Equity

As of July 2022, the department has 1,291 employees. The department's headquarters are located at 501 North Wilmington Street in Raleigh. The Excise Office, responsible for enforcing the Motor Fuels Tax, Motor Carrier Tax, Tobacco Products Tax, Privilege License Tax, and Alcoholic Beverages Tax, is housed on Terminal Drive. The department maintains other offices to serve the public in Raleigh, Asheville, Charlotte, Durham, Elizabeth City, Fayetteville, Greensboro, Greenville, Hickory, Rocky Mount, and Wilmington.

List of Secretaries/Commissioners of Revenue
The following secretaries/commissioners have held this position:

Notes:

References

Works cited 
 
 

Government of North Carolina
Revenue
1921 establishments in North Carolina
Organizations based in Raleigh, North Carolina